Athenae or Athenai was a city and port of ancient Pontus, with a Greek temple of Athena. According to Arrian, it was 180 stadia east of the river Adienus, and 280 stadia west of Apsarus. Procopius writes that the name of the village came from a certain woman named Athenaea in early times who ruled over the land and not because, as some believe, of colonists from Athens settled there. He also adds that the tomb of the woman was still there.
Arrian speaks of the place as a deserted fort, but Procopius describes it as a populous place in his time. Konrad Mannert assumes it to be the same place as the Odeinius of the Periplus of Pseudo-Scylax.

Its site is located near the modern town of Pazar, in Turkey.

References

Populated places in ancient Pontus
Former populated places in Turkey
Ancient Greek archaeological sites in Turkey
History of Rize Province